National Highway 130B, commonly referred to as NH 130B, is a national highway in  India. It is a spur road of National Highway 30. NH-130B traverses the state of Chhattisgarh.

Route 
Raipur, Palari, Baloda Bazar, Kasdol, Sarangarh.

Junctions 

  Terminal near Raipur.
  Terminal near Sarangarh.

See also 

 List of National Highways in India
 List of National Highways in India by state

References

External links 

 NH 130B on OpenStreetMap

National highways in India
National Highways in Chhattisgarh